The capture of Aden of 1548 was accomplished when Ottomans under Piri Reis managed to take the harbour of Aden in Yemen from the Portuguese on 26 February 1548.

Background 

Aden had already been captured by the Ottomans for Suleiman the Magnificent in 1538 by Hadim Suleiman Pasha, in order to provide an Ottoman base for raids against Portuguese possessions on the western coast of India. Sailing on to India, the Ottomans failed against the Portuguese at the siege of Diu in September 1538, but then returned to Aden where they fortified the city with 100 pieces of artillery.

From this base, Sulayman Pasha managed to take control of the whole country of Yemen, also taking Sanaa. In 1547, Aden arose against the Ottomans however and invited the Portuguese instead, so that the Portuguese were in control of the city.

The Battle 
Ali bin Suleyman al-Tawlaki who was a local chieftain fought the Ottoman navy of 60 ships of various sizes which arrived on 15 November 1547 until he died, then he was succeeded by his son, Mohammed, who kept resisting until a small Portuguese fleet arrived on 19 January 1548. However, the Portuguese were forced to retreat to Zeila, where 120 sailors were captured, and their ships were burned. Eventually, the Ottomans managed to win and the city was captured by Piri Reis on 26 February 1548.

Aftermath 
Piri Reis would continue with successes against the Portuguese with the capture of Muscat (1552).

Notes

Aden
Ottoman period in Yemen
Piri Reis
Suleiman the Magnificent
Aden
Aden
1548 in Asia
Capture of Aden
1548 in Portugal